The Most Gigantic Lying Mouth of All Time is a collection of 24 short films from the English alternative rock band Radiohead. It was directed and edited by Chris Bran of the Vapour Brothers.

It was released on DVD on 1 December 2004. The DVD release contains all four episodes of the original broadcast from Radiohead Television, an online television station, featuring unheard songs from the band, live studio performances, as well as interviews.

The Most Gigantic Lying Mouth of All Time is named after a collage by German artist John Heartfield.

Background
Episodes of The Most Gigantic Lying Mouth of All Time were originally developed to be a programme on a regular television channel, or even on Radiohead's own channel. "This was originally meant to be four episodes shown on our very own television channel,” Radiohead frontman Thom Yorke explained on the band's website.

Instead, the group went on to create an internet TV channel Radiohead Television in conjunction with the release of their 2003 album Hail to the Thief. Along with the episodes for The Most Gigantic Lying Mouth of All Time, other clips including promotional videos, webcast footage from live performances, as well as webcast footage from the studio were broadcast.

On 10 May 2003, a two-minute trailer went live with the promotional video for Radiohead's single "There There". The site fully launched on 26 May with a 30-minute show.

All four episodes were shown on Radiohead Television, where they could be watched for free in QuickTime format. Programming started on the hour, with visitors who did not get to the site on time faced with a test card and 1970s-style intermission music.

After running for several months this website was replaced with an advertisement for the DVD.

Release
The DVD cover features original artwork by long-time collaborators Stanley Donwood and Thom Yorke, under the alias "Dr. Tchock", plus sleeve notes written by Yorke.

Several of the short films were shown as interval entertainment at Jonny Greenwood's performances at the 2005 Ether Festival.

The DVD was self-released, as Radiohead's contract with record label EMI (Parlophone/Capitol) was fulfilled after COM LAG (2plus2isfive). It was initially available to order through the band's website. In January 2020, Radiohead released it free on their website.

Episodes
Some of the sections of The Most Gigantic Lying Mouth of All Time were created by Chris Bran, Stanley Donwood and Radiohead, while others were directed by fans who submitted videos that were selected for inclusion by the band.

Producers Rick Hind and Ajit N. Rao created two segments by The Tripti Ensemble Crew, one called "When an Angel Tries to Sell you Something", and another called "Freak Juice".

The DVD also features interviews with Thom Yorke and Ed O'Brien as part of a feature entitled "My Showbiz Life". Yorke's voice is altered to an unnaturally deep pitch, whilst O'Brien responds to questions by emitting braying noises.

Chieftan Mews
Each of the four episodes is introduced and closed by commentary from Chieftan Mews, a digital composite character played by Radiohead producer Nigel Godrich.

Chieftan Mews also "sings" (actually just reading the lyrics) a humorous cover of "No Surprises" at the end of the DVD, and makes a brief cameo in the 2007 Thumbs Down webcast.

Episode One
The Cat Girl (directed by Ebba Erikzon)
The Slave (directed by James Field)
When an Angel Tries to Sell You Something (directed by Rick Hind and Ajit N. Rao)
Skyscape (directed by Vernie Yeung)
Sit Down. Stand Up. (directed by Ed Holdsworth)

Episode Two
Lament (directed by Cath Elliot)
The Big Switch (directed by Chris Levitus)
The Scream (directed by Paulo Neves)
Inside of My Head (directed by Ashley Dean)
De Tripas Y Corazon (directed by Juan Pablo Etcheverry)

Episode Three
Listen to Me Wandsworth Road (directed by Ebba Erikzon)
Hypnogoga (directed by Louise Wilde)
And Murders of Crows (directed by Paul Rains)
Freak Juice Commercial (directed by Rick Hind and Ajit N. Rao)
"Running" (directed by Hannah Wise and Chinacake Productions)
Push Pulk / Spinning Plates (directed by Johnny Hardstaff)

Episode Four
Dog Interface (directed by Juan Pablo Etcheverry)
HYTTE (directed by Gary Carpenter)
Momentum (directed by Camella Kirk)
Chickenbomb (directed by Vernie Yeung)
Welcome to My Lupine Hell (directed by Ashley Dean)
The Homeland Hodown (directed by Jason Archer and Paul Beck)
I Might Be Wrong (directed by Sophie Muller)
The National Anthem (directed by Mike Mills)

References

External links
Vapour Brothers
The Most Gigantic Lying Mouth of All Time at w.a.s.t.e.

Radiohead video albums
British non-fiction web series
2004 video albums